John Edwards has unsuccessfully run for U.S. President twice:

John Edwards 2004 presidential campaign, but ended in Edwards as vice presidential nominee
John Edwards 2008 presidential campaign